FASNY may refer to:

Firefighters Association of the State of New York
French-American School of New York